Deremius is a genus of beetles in the family Cerambycidae, containing the following species:

 Deremius fuscotibialis Breuning, 1981
 Deremius leptus Kolbe, 1894
 Deremius matilei Breuning, 1981

References

Agapanthiini